Zachary Vigil (born March 28, 1991) is a former American football linebacker. He played college football at Utah State and was signed by the Miami Dolphins as an undrafted free agent in 2015.

Professional career

Miami Dolphins
Vigil was signed by the Miami Dolphins as an undrafted free agent in 2015. He made the 53-man roster as a rookie and played in all 16 regular-season games with two starts. 

Vigil was placed on the Reserve/NFI list to start the 2016 season with a back injury. He was activated off the NFI list on November 5, 2016 prior to Week 9 of the 2016 season. He was released on December 19, 2016.

Washington Redskins
On December 20, 2016, Vigil was claimed off waivers by the Washington Redskins. He was waived on September 2, 2017.

Buffalo Bills
On September 4, 2017, Vigil was signed to the Buffalo Bills' practice squad. He was released on October 31, 2017.

Washington Redskins (second stint)
On November 15, 2017, Vigil signed with the Redskins.

Personal life
Vigil is the older brother of linebacker Nick Vigil. Both he and his brother initially pursued a career in bull riding until their father pushed the brothers into playing football after Zach suffered a major injury while bull riding. Vigil married his wife Kaitlin in 2017.

References

External links

Utah State Aggies bio
Miami Dolphins bio
Washington Redskins bio

1991 births
Living people
Players of American football from Utah
People from Clearfield, Utah
American football linebackers
Utah State Aggies football players
Miami Dolphins players
Washington Redskins players
Buffalo Bills players